The Bodenseeklinik is a private clinic in Lindau, Germany. The clinic was founded by Dr. Werner Mang, who is also the medical director. 
Every year, approximately 2,000–3,000 plastic surgeries are performed at the Bodenseeklinik.

History 
In 1989, the clinic was founded by Dr. Werner Mang. Initially started as a small private clinic for plastic surgery, the clinic’s capacity has grown from six to ten and later 20 beds. Ten years later, in 2000, the new hospital wing worth €25 million was built on the Western part of the small island that belongs to the city of Lindau.
The new building was built directly on the shores of Lake Constance in park-like surroundings. In 2003, the building’s extension was finished and opened as a private clinic which specialized in plastic and aesthetic surgery. Nowadays, the Bodenseeklinik features 50 beds on two wards, five operating rooms, one auditorium and a research lab. Currently, it is the biggest private clinic for aesthetic surgery in Europe.

Medical principles and training facility 
The Bodenseeklinik follows a “gentle path to beauty”, and all doctors work and teach according to this principle. Mang and his team always stress the importance of preserving both health and the natural looks of the patients. The „Mang School“ believes in the motto Less is more. Following this motto the director, Prof. Mang published the book a Manual of Aesthetic Surgery which features the current trend towards more gentle surgical methods.
As a training hospital, the clinic features one lecture hall. From here, live videos of operations are streamed so that young doctors can watch them during their classes.

Social Commitment
Medical director Werner Mang, Chairman of the Prof.-Mang-Foundation, performs surgery on children from socially weak families. Lately, the plastic surgeon operated the elven year old boy Suresh from Nepal. Suresh was suffering from a tumor that disfigured his face and denied him to eat and talk. The family could not afford any medication or operation. With the support of his colleague, Mang reconstructed the face of the young boy in an eight-hour surgical intervention free of charge.
The Bodenseeklinik also does facial reconstruction for all victims injured by the Ramstein air show disaster. There is often more than one operation needed to reconstruct the facial appearance for fire victims.

Facts 

Clinic
 5 operating rooms
 50 beds
 20 rooms

Service
 Hotel service
 Health & beauty farm
 Physiotherapy
 Medical check-ups

Staff
 3 doctors
 5 nurses
 4 anesthesia nurses
 8 stationary workers
 11 employees for administration and ambulance
 4 employees in the technical and cleaning section

Operations
 Nasal Surgery (Rhinoplasty)
 Face Lifting
 Eyelid Correction (Blepharoplasty)
 Breast Surgery (Mammoplasty)
 Ear Pinning (Otoplasty)
 Liposuction
 Hair Transplantation
 Injected Implants (Collagen, Hylaform, Fat implants, Botox)
 Firming – Tummy Tucks (Abdominoplasty), Thigh- and Upper-Arm Firming (Brachioplasty)
 Dermabrasion and Chemical Peeling
 Laser Peeling

Famous patients 
 Marcus Schenkenberg, international model
 Costa Cordalis, German singer
 Fritz Wepper, German actor

External links 
 official Website of the Bodenseeklinik 
 This article includes information translated from the German-Wikipedia.

References 

Clinics
Hospitals in Germany
Medical and health organisations based in Bavaria